Joby Aviation is a United States venture-backed aviation company, developing an electric vertical takeoff and landing (eVTOL) aircraft that it intends to operate as an air taxi service. Joby Aviation is headquartered in Santa Cruz, California, and has offices in San Carlos, California; Marina, California; and Munich, Germany.

History 

Joby Aviation was founded on September 11, 2009 (called Joby Aero) as one of several projects incubated by JoeBen Bevirt on his ranch in the Santa Cruz Mountains, using the proceeds from successful exits of previous companies. According to the company's website, the early years were spent exploring different components of electric aviation, including electric motors, flight software, and lithium-ion batteries. This research led Joby to participate in the NASA LEAPTech and X-57 Maxwell projects, before developing its own air taxi concept. Joby's early concept, publicly called the S2, had eight tilting propellers arrayed along the leading edge of its wing and four more tilting propellers mounted on its V-shaped tail. Later, the company moved to a configuration that features six rotating propellers.

By 2015, the company was operating subscale prototypes of its eVTOL aircraft, moving to full-scale unmanned prototypes in 2017, and a production prototype in 2019. In 2018, the company announced a Series B funding round of $100 million, led by Toyota AI Ventures. By 2019, the company was in active conversations with the FAA about certifying the aircraft and announced a partnership with Uber's Elevate division.

For its first ten years, Joby operated in stealth mode, sometimes leading to skepticism of the company's claims. The first journalist granted access to the aircraft in 2018 agreed not to disclose details about the aircraft. In 2020, however, the company began releasing significantly more information, starting with its January announcement of a $590 million funding round, led by Toyota Motor Corporation. At that announcement, the company revealed its production vehicle. In January 2020, Bevirt was a keynote speaker at the meeting of the Vertical Flight Society.

In January 2020, Joby announced plans to manufacture the aircraft in Marina, California at the Marina Municipal Airport. The plans include an initial 55,000 square foot production facility, followed by a 500,000 square foot factory. Late in 2020, Joby Aviation acquired Uber Elevate, and the U.S. Air Force announced it had granted Joby its first eVTOL airworthiness certification as part of its Agility Prime program.

In February 2021, the company announced a partnership with Garmin to provide flight deck equipment and announced that it had obtained a 'G-1' certification basis for its aircraft with the FAA. In May, 2021, a NOVA episode featured Joby.

The City and FAA approved the company's plan in June 2021.

In August 2021, the company announced a 155-mile flight on a single charge in 77 minutes, comparative noise tests against other aircraft and its application for air Part 135 and Part 23 carrier certifications. The battery used an 811 NMC (nickel-manganese-cobalt oxide) cathode and a graphite anode. On August 11, the company went public using a special-purpose acquisition company.

On February 16, 2022, a remotely piloted prototype crashed during a test flight in rural California, sustaining substantial damage. The National Transportation Safety Board determined that the crash and subsequent fire were caused by an in-flight component failure.

In May 2022, Joby received Part 135 air service certification from the FAA, operating a fleet of Cirrus SR22s while it continues seeking certification for its eVTOL aircraft.

February, 2023 marked the beginning of final assembly of Joby's first confirming aircraft, using the planned production process and a low-volume production line. This aircraft is projected to begin flight testing during the first half of 2023. Earlier in February, Joby announced it had completed the second of five stages required by the FAA to certify its eVTOL aircraft for commercial passenger use. Joby claimed it was the first eVTOL company to reach this milestone and also affirmed its target of launching commercial passenger service by 2025.

Financing 
The company was originally self-financed by Bevirt, after the sale of his previous companies, Velocity11 and GorillaPod. On February 1, 2018, Joby Aviation announced it raised $100 million in a Series B round of funding, including from Intel Capital, Toyota AI Ventures, Jet Blue Technology Ventures, and Tesla/SpaceX-backer Capricorn Investment Group. On January 15, 2020, Joby Aviation announced a Series C round of funding, totaling $590 million, led by Toyota Motor Corporation and a manufacturing partnership with Toyota. In December 2020, Joby Aviation acquired Elevate, Uber's air taxi division, and also received a $75 million investment from Uber, bringing Joby Aviation's total funds raised to $820 million.

In January 2021, it was reported that Joby Aviation was exploring a special-purpose acquisition company (also known as "blank check corporation") to become a public company. In February 2021, the company entered into a business combination agreement with Reinvent Technology Partners, a SPAC funded by LinkedIn co-founder Reid Hoffman and Zynga founder Mark Pincus.
Shares in the SPAC, incorporated October 2020 in the Cayman Islands in 2020, were traded on the New York Stock Exchange as the symbol RTP. Upon the closing of the transaction, the combined company will be named Joby Aviation, and become publicly traded, with its common stock to be listed on the New York Stock Exchange as the symbol JOBY.

Technology and service 

Near silent in flight, the aircraft is designed to be 100 times quieter during takeoff and landing than a helicopter. Joby plans to mass-produce its aircraft, with a plan to operate a piloted on-demand air-taxi service. The aircraft will be electrically-powered and operate with zero emissions. The aircraft will be operated as a service with per-trip passenger pricing.

Joby described the Uber Elevate acquisition as a way to accelerate its commercial launch through Elevate's tools and personnel. Elevate had previously operated a service called Uber Copter, which allowed all Uber users in the New York area to book a trip to John F. Kennedy International Airport, with a car taking riders to a heliport and a helicopter then took riders to the airport. While the service used Bell 430 helicopters with Uber branding, the aircraft were operated by a separate helicopter company, Heliflite. Joby Aviation cited Elevate's software tools enabling market selection, demand simulation and multi-modal operations as the reasons to purchase Elevate, suggesting the acquisition may play a significant role in Joby's commercial service. Joby has not commented on whether it will continue Elevate's plans to launch in Los Angeles, Dallas, and Melbourne.

See also 
 EHang
 Lilium
 Volocopter (also backed by Intel)
 Zunum Aero (also backed by JetBlue)

References

External links
 
 
 

2009 establishments in California
Aerospace companies of the United States
Aircraft manufacturers of the United States
American companies established in 2009
Electric aircraft
Emerging technologies
Flying cars in fiction
Manufacturing companies based in California
Manufacturing companies established in 2009
Companies based in Santa Cruz, California
Roadable aircraft
Urban air mobility
Special-purpose acquisition companies